Nón Ba tầm is a traditional Vietnamese flat palm hat. It should be distinguished from other traditional Vietnamese headwear such as the conical nón lá and the coiled turban, khăn vấn. 

Nón Ba tầm is traditionally worn by women in Vietnam, as an accessory to finer garments, as opposed to the more functional clothes associated with farm work. Until the early 20th century, this hat was widespread in Northern Vietnam.
    
The hats worn by shamans, traditionally had silver ornaments hanging from silk strings around the brim.

Origin of the hat 
According to documents from the French at the end of the nineteenth century, Ba tầm were translated into French as, Le chapeau de trois tầm (literally "the hat of three tầm), tầm (尋) was an ancient unit of measurement used in China, Korea, Japan, and Vietnam. The measurement is equivalent to an arm span. According to Vũ trung tùy bút, the Ba tầm hat is a combination of styles of dậu, mền giải, and viên cơ hats. The hat is attested in literature since the 18th century, but its origin could be a lot older than that.
 Nón mền giải (Also referred to as Ngoan Xác lạp 黿殼笠 and Tam Giang lạp 三江笠) - was worn by the elderly during the Revival Lê dynasty, which then fell of fashion.
 Nón vỏ bứa (Also referred to as Toan Bì lạp, 酸皮笠) - was worn by the poor, is a simplified version of the nón mền giải, where it was made smaller. During the Nguyễn dynasty, it was referred to in literature as Thủy Thủ lạp (水手笠).
 Nón dậu (Cổ châu lạp, 古洲笠) - was worn by elderly relatives of mandarins, middle-class men and women, scholars and commoners in the capital. The top is pointed and has a flat rim with a few beams of thao thread, a type of silk.
 Viên cơ lạp (圓箕笠) appeared in Hoan Châu province (Modern-day Nghệ An province). During the Revival Lê dynasty, it was worn by soldiers during the Arrogant Soldiers Rebellion (Loạn kiêu binh) during the Later Lê dynasty, with a long design, it almost like a winnowing basket (nia). During the Nguyễn dynasty, it was redesigned as a small hat, similar to the nón thúng, but with a square bevel, hats smaller than nón Ba tầm called a nón Nghệ (referred to in French, Le chapeau de Nghệ-an) was typically worn by women. Nón thúng (Chapeau en forme de panier) was worn by men and women, and had bronze tapered design when compared to Nghệ hats.

Construction of the hat 
Ba tầm hats are covered with palm leaves or gồi leaves, shaped like a parasol or mushroom ears, flat top, cone diameter about 70–80 cm, the brim 10–12 cm higher or more. The inside of the hat is attached with a funnel-shaped rim called a khua or khùa (摳) in order to reinforce the hat on the user's head. In addition, people often tie the colorful thao thread to the brim of the hat to make a charm. Presently, nón quai thao is often used to refer to a nón Ba tầm, it was because of an improved design by writer Kim Lân and his son to be more compact and suitable for artistic activities, this type of hat was later adopted by female singers Quan họ where it became more popular.

Cultural Significance

Gallery

See also 
 Vietnamese Clothing
 Nón lá
 Khăn vấn
 Mũ chữ Đinh
 Mũ Phốc Đầu

References

Vietnamese headgear
Vietnamese words and phrases
Hats